John Warren Womble, Jr. (March 15, 1920 – March 21, 2015) was an American basketball coach. He was the head coach of the Peoria Cats, a National Industrial Basketball League (NIBL) team, located in Peoria, Illinois, and the head coach of the 1952 United States men's Olympic basketball team.

Early life
Born in Aylesworth, Oklahoma, Womble attended college at Southeastern Oklahoma State University, where he was a two-sport Savage Storm athlete, earning letters in tennis and basketball. He was a guard on the school's basketball team that reached the quarterfinals of the AAU National Tournament in Denver, Colorado, in 1948.

Coaching career

Club coaching career
At the club level, Womble was the head coach of the Peoria Cats for 10 seasons (1951–60). With the Cats, he won 296 games and lost 126, while leading his teams to the National Amateur Athletic Union Tournament championship five times. He coached the Cats team that tied with the Bartlesville Phillips 66ers, for the most wins in the National Industrial Basketball League (14–10 overall record), in 1954. Womble would later go on to serve as the first director of the National Industrial Basketball League.

National team coaching career
In international competition, Womble had an unbelievable 34–0 record against some of the best international competition in the world. In 1952, Womble's Cats won the Olympic Trials Tournament. He was then named head coach of the 1952 United States men's Olympic basketball team. Team USA (a team which included seven of his Cats players) went on to defeat the Soviet Union in the final of the 1952 Helsinki Summer Olympics, by a score of 36–25, to win the gold medal.

Womble also coached the USA national team that won the gold medal at the 1954 FIBA World Championship. Later, he coached the first United States team to tour the Soviet Union, in 1958. In 1960, his Cats placed second in the Olympic Trials Tournament. Womble was named as assistant coach of the U.S. team at the 1960 Rome Summer Olympics. That team included Hall of Fame members Jerry West, Oscar Robertson, Walt Bellamy, and Jerry Lucas. They defeated Brazil, by a score of 90–36, to win the gold medal.

Honors
Womble was named to the Helms Foundation Hall of Fame.
Womble was named to the Oklahoma Athletic Hall of Fame, in 1977. 
Womble was inducted into the Southeastern Athletic Hall of Fame, on February 18, 1978.

Personal life
Womble served in the United States Army. He worked in management with Caterpillar Corporation, until he retired in 1985. Womble died on March 21, 2015, at the age of 95, in Springdale, Arkansas. He was survived by his wife, Hazel and daughter, Donna.

See also 
 FIBA Basketball World Cup winning head coaches

References

External links
WARREN WOMBLE

1920 births
2015 deaths
Amateur Athletic Union men's basketball players
American male tennis players
American men's basketball coaches
American men's basketball players
American Olympic coaches
Basketball coaches from Oklahoma
Basketball players from Oklahoma
Guards (basketball)
People from Durant, Oklahoma
Southeastern Oklahoma State Savage Storm men's basketball players
United States men's national basketball team coaches
United States Army soldiers